Something for Everybody is the sixth studio album by  American singer and musician Elvis Presley, released on RCA Victor in mono and stereo, LPM/LSP 2370, in June 17, 1961. Recording sessions took place on November 8, 1960, at Radio Recorders in Hollywood, and on March 12, 1961 at RCA Studio B in Nashville, Tennessee. In the United States, it peaked at number 1 on Billboards Top Pop LPs chart. It was certified Gold on July 15, 1999 by the Recording Industry Association of America. The album remained at #1 for three weeks.

Background
After his military discharge from the army in March 1960, any doubts about Presley's ability to recapture the momentum of his career in the 1950s was laid to rest. During that year his three singles all topped the charts, and his first album, Elvis Is Back!, went to number 2 on the albums chart. His musical film G.I. Blues was wildly successful, its soundtrack album also going to number 1.

Content
Side one of the record contains slow, sentimental love ballads, while side two features uptempo rock and roll and R&B, hence the album's title.

Presley entered the familiar Studio B in Nashville on March 12, 1961 and recorded eleven of the tracks for this album in one twelve-hour session, in addition to the single "I Feel So Bad". The single was initially scheduled to be the twelfth track for the album, but Presley chose, after RCA executive Bill Bullock overruled the Colonel who wanted "Wild In The Country" paired with "I Slipped, I Stumbled, I Fell" as the single, it to accompany the title track to the film Wild in the Country as the promotional 45 for the film. Another track that had appeared in the film but not released commercially on records, "I Slipped, I Stumbled, I Fell", became the final track for the album.

Reissues
The July 13, 1999, compact disc reissue included six bonus tracks, four singles and two b-sides recorded over the span of a year and issued in 1961 and 1962, and altered the album's running order. All of the sides made the Top 40 at a time when Billboard charted B-sides as well, and two of the singles, "Surrender" and "Good Luck Charm", topped the singles chart. "Surrender" had been recorded at the sessions for Presley's gospel album of 1960, His Hand in Mine, and the sides for 47-7908 and 47-7992 at sessions specifically to produce singles. The entirety of the 1999 reissue appeared on the Legacy Edition reissue of Elvis Is Back! released in 2011. Bonus tracks were all recorded at Studio B in Nashville.

In 2006 Something for Everybody was reissued on the Follow That Dream label as a special 2-disc CD collection containing the original tracks along with numerous alternate takes.

Track listing

Original release

1999 reissue with bonus tracks
{{Track listing
|collapsed=yes
|headline={{nobold|Positions for single releases are from [[Billboard Hot 100|''Billboards Pop Singles]] chart.}}
|extra_column=Recording date
|title1=Surrender 
|writer1=Doc Pomus and Mort Shuman 
|extra1=October 30, 1960
|length1=1:51
|note1=released February 7, 1961, RCA 47-7850, #1 
|title2=There's Always Me 
|writer2=Don Robertson 
|extra2=March 12, 1961
|length2=2:16
|title3=Give Me the Right 
|writer3=Fred Wise and Norman Blagman 
|extra3=March 12, 1961
|length3=2:32
|title4=It's a Sin
|writer4=Fred Rose and Zeb Turner 
|extra4=March 12, 1961
|length4=2:39
|title5=Sentimental Me 
|writer5=James T. Morehead and James Cassin 
|extra5=March 13, 1961
|length5=2:31
|title6=Starting Today
|writer6=Don Robertson 
|extra6=March 13, 1961
|length6=2:03
|title7=Gently 
|writer7=Murray Wisell and Edward Lisbona 
|extra7=March 12, 1961
|length7=2:15
|title8=I'm Coming Home 
|writer8=Charlie Rich 
|extra8=March 12, 1961
|length8=2:20
|title9=In Your Arms 
|writer9=Aaron Schroeder and Wally Gold 
|extra9=March 12, 1961
|length9=1:50
|title10=Put the Blame On Me
|writer10=Fred Wise, Kay Twomey, Norman Blagman
|extra10=March 13, 1961
|length10=1:57
|title11=Judy
|writer11=Teddy Redell 
|extra11=March 13, 1961
|length11=2:10
|title12=I Want You With Me
|writer12=Woody Harris 
|extra12=March 12, 1961
|length12=2:13
|title13=I Feel So Bad 
|writer13=Chuck Willis 
|extra13=March 12, 1961
|length13=2:53
|note13=May 2, 1961, RCA 47-7880, #5 
|title14=(Marie's the Name) His Latest Flame 
|writer14=Doc Pomus and Mort Shuman 
|extra14=June 25, 1961
|length14=2:07
|note14=August 8, 1961, RCA 47-7908, #4 
|title15=Little Sister 
|writer15=Doc Pomus and Mort Shuman 
|extra15=June 25, 1961
|length15=2:30
|note15=August 8, 1961, RCA 47-7908b, #5 
|title16=Good Luck Charm 
|writer16=Aaron Schroeder and Wally Gold 
|extra16=October 15, 1961
|length16=2:23 
|note16=February 27, 1962, RCA 47-7992, #1 
|title17=Anything That's Part of You 
|writer17=Don Robertson 
|extra17=October 15, 1961
|length17=2:04
|note17=February 27, 1962, RCA 47-7992b, #31 
|title18=I Slipped, I Stumbled, I Fell 
|writer18=Fred Wise and Ben Weisman 
|extra18=November 8, 1960
|length18=1:35
}}

2006 Follow That Dream CD reissueNote* signifies previously unreleased

PersonnelOn March 12–13, 1961 Elvis Presley – vocals, acoustic rhythm guitar
 Millie Kirkham – backing vocals
 The Jordanaires – backing vocals
 Boots Randolph – saxophone
 Scotty Moore – electric guitar
 Hank Garland – electric guitar
 Floyd Cramer – piano
 Bob Moore – double bass
 D.J. Fontana – drums
 Buddy Harman – drumsOn November 8, 1960'''
 Elvis Presley – vocals, acoustic rhythm guitar
 The Jordanaires – backing vocals
 Scotty Moore – electric rhythm guitar
 Tiny Timbrell – lead guitar
 Dudley Brooks – piano
 Meyer Rubin – double bass
 D.J. Fontana – drums

Charts

See also
The Nashville A-Team

References

External links

LPM-2370 Something for Everybody Guide part of The Elvis Presley Record Research Database
LSP-2370 Something for Everybody  Guide part of The Elvis Presley Record Research Database

Elvis Presley albums
1961 albums
RCA Records albums
Albums produced by Steve Sholes